Corella, officially the Municipality of Corella,  is a 5th class municipality in the province of Bohol, Philippines. According to the 2020 census, it has a population of 9,479 people.

Corella is known primarily as the home of the endemic Philippine tarsier, one of the world's smallest primates.

The people of Corella are predominantly conservative Roman Catholics belonging to the parish of Our Lady of the Village whose feast is celebrated on 27 April.

History

Its former name was Nugas before it obtained its present name, Corella. It was then a barrio of Baclayon. The adoption of the name Corella was made at the behest of Fr Jose Maria Cabañas del Carmen, then the parish priest of Baclayon and endorsed by Fr Felix Guillen de San Jose, the first Spanish priest. Corella was a name of a village in Navarra, Spain where this town's patroness, Nuestra Señora del Villar, showered miracles.

The creation of this town was due to the efforts of its inhabitants including Isidoro Ramo, who became its first gobernadorcillo.

The stone church and the convent were constructed during the tenure of Fr Felix Gullen and completed by later priests, one of them being Fr Dionisio Llorete who also spearheaded the erection of two stone school buildings and the municipal building during the term of the gobernadorcillo, Celedonio Sayon. But the construction of Corella's present concrete church began in 1924 under Fr Pedro Montelbon, the parish priest of Tagbilaran who took over the administration of the Corella parish after the incumbent, Fr Eugenio Desamparados left.

A battle of principles, rights, obligations, and duties raged in the municipality in 1920 between Simeon Sambola, the parish priest and the municipal president Nicanor C. Tocmo who were at loggerheads on the matter of school administration. From the pulpit, Fr Simeon lambasted the municipal administration and condemned the teachings in Corella schools as having originated from the mouth of hell. Enrollment in the school greatly diminished. Only close family friends and relatives of president Tocmo sent their children to school. The local civil administration complained to the provincial and national authorities. After a fact-finding investigation by the Department of Public Instruction whose report was submitted to the Governor-General, Fr Simeon was removed.

During the Japanese occupation, the area at a distance halfway between Corella and Gaboc was "no-man's land". Several civilians were arrested there by the Japanese and executed on the spot. Honorio Butawan, a bolo volunteer, was caught by the enemy, and taken to Tagbilaran never to return. Other civilians of Corella suffered instant death from the Japanese as the latter tried to escape the US army of liberation.

In October 1944, Capt. Martin Maliwanag, a guerrilla leader under Major Ismael Ingeniero established his headquarters in Corella, making the convent his command post and the primary school building east of the town plaza his detention cell. Several Filipino JCs (Japanese Constabulary) surrendered voluntarily. The first to surrender on 29 October 1944 was Lt. Victorio Sumodabila. He was shot on the spot by Capt. Maliwanag. Four other JCs from Corella who were killed and buried in common grave of Corella were Dandong Lamayo, his brother Fermin Lamayo, Felicisimo Guscal, and his brother-in-law, Celistino Formentera. In all, there were nine Filipino JCs who met their violent deaths in Corella on orders of Capt. Maliwanag, who met his own death when he attacked the Japanese garrison in Gaboc. His body was buried in the same cemetery as his victims. It was Maliwanag's men who captured the puppet Japanese governor Agapito Hontanosas.

During the guerrilla period, Corella had four mayors closely succeeding each other:
 The Commonwealth-elected mayor Catalino C. Vale, who was suspected to be a Japanese puppet, was detained in Behind The Clouds (San Jose) in Batuan, where the Bohol Area Command (BAC) of the guerilla forces had its headquarters.
Roman Calotes Tocmo who was named acting vice mayor by the guerillas and Tiburcio Aranas who was the acting mayor.
 After Aranas's death, Jose Clarin replaced him. 
When Clarin went on leave, he was substituted by Isaac Filo.

Geography

Barangays
Corella comprises 8 barangays, all classified as rural:

Climate

Demographics

From 1990, a marked decrease in population is noted. Groups of people migrated to other parts of the country, such as Mindanao, where they founded a new municipality, "New Corella".

Economy

Corella does not have any major industry. A great majority of the people of the town are engaged in small-scale home businesses.

Gallery

References

External links

 [ Philippine Standard Geographic Code]
Municipality of Corella
 Corella
 Corella Bohol

Municipalities of Bohol